Fighting Frontier is a 1943 Western film directed by Lambert Hillyer.

Plot
A detective goes undercover as a bandit.

Cast
 Tim Holt
 Cliff Edwards
 Ann Summers
 William Gould
 Slim Whitaker

References

External list

1943 films
American Western (genre) films
1943 Western (genre) films
RKO Pictures films
Films produced by Bert Gilroy
Films directed by Lambert Hillyer
American black-and-white films
1940s American films